Bishop Leon Malyi (born 17 August 1958 in Bar, Vinnytsia Oblast, Ukrainian SSR) is a Ukrainian Roman Catholic prelate, the Titular Bishop of Tabunia and Auxiliary bishop of the Archdiocese of Lviv since 4 May 2002.

Life
Leon Malyi was born in the family of Yan and Henovefa (née Hutsal) Malyi in the Podolia. After graduation of the school education, continued to study at the Lviv cinema college. In the same time he joined the clandestine Roman Catholic Theological Seminary under the supervision of Father Henrik Mosing: he was ordained as priest on June 7, 1984, by clandestine Bishop Jan Cienski (single Roman Catholic bishop in the territory of Ukraine) after graduation of the theological studies.

During 1984–1990 he worked as a clandestine priest in the Podolia region and after the Dissolution of the Soviet Union began to work openly until 1995. Fr. Malyi continued to study in the Pontifical University of the Holy Cross in Rome with Doctor of Sacred Theology degree (1995–2000). He returned to Ukraine in 2000 and began to work as a Prefect in the Major Roman Catholic Theological Seminary in Lviv (2000–2002).

On May 4, 2002, he was appointed by  Pope John Paul II as the second Auxiliary Bishop of the Archdiocese of Lviv, Ukraine, and Titular Bishop of Tabunia. On June 20, 2002, he was consecrated as bishop by Metropolitan Archbishop Marian Cardinal Jaworski and other prelates of the Roman Catholic Church.

References

1958 births
Living people
People from Bar, Ukraine
Ukrainian people of Polish descent
Pontifical University of the Holy Cross alumni
21st-century Roman Catholic bishops in the United States